Jean of the Joneses is a 2016 Canadian-American film written and directed by Stella Meghie in her directorial debut. The film, starring Taylour Paige as the eponymous Jean Jones, premiered at the 2016 SXSW Film Festival.

Plot
Jean Jones is a writer who comes from a family of Jamaican-American matriarchs. After her boyfriend tells her he needs space she moves out of his apartment and goes to dinner at her grandmother's house. Just as the family is about to sit down to dinner the doorbell rings and Jean goes to answer it. It is a man, who abruptly dies after asking for Jean's grandmother. While Jean goes with him to the hospital, she is hit on by Ray, the ambulance EMT. The dead man's things reveal he is Gordan Jones and after confronting her family, Jean learns that he is her estranged grandfather.

Jean goes to live with her aunt, Anne, a pot smoking nurse who is having an affair with a doctor and confides to Jean that she is pregnant with his child. Jean is a poor houseguest, leading Anne to kick her out. Jean goes to stay with her strict mother, Maureen. Maureen is critical of Jean's failure as an author, working as a waitress after using up the advance of her last book, while also critical of her daughter's budding relationship with Ray. Jean manages to convince Maureen to claim Gordan's body and throw him a funeral, but after Maureen asks Jean when she is moving back with her boyfriend, Jean moves out and goes to live with her aunt Janet.

While at Janet's, Jean discovers that Janet is separated from her husband and that she has a secret aunt Laura, from her father's relationship with another woman. Talking to Laura, Jean learns that Laura was a baby when Gordan left her mother, then inadvertently divulges that Gordan died, something Laura had no idea about.

At Gordan's wake Jean confronts her family. Her grandmother reveals that she always knew that Gordan was still living nearby in Harlem and lied about him returning to Jamaica, which devastates her daughters for having been prevented from seeing their father. Jean reveals her discovery that grandmother has a boyfriend, which her aunts realize is her mother's decades-long boyfriend. She also invites Ray, who reveals that he read her book of short stories and asks her if she truly believes she is destined to end up single and alone, telling her that to do so would be a choice, not her fate.

Jean goes to her old boyfriend, Jeremiah  who tells her that they are over for good. With nowhere to go and having used up all the goodwill from her family, Jean goes to Gordan's home where she discovers that he was a recorded jazz musician, that he followed her writing career and unearths his will.

At Gordan's funeral Jean reads out a statement from his will where he apologized for being a terrible father and abandoning his children.

After hearing what their father said, the Jones women begin to heal. Maureen tells Jean she loves her, Anne decides to keep her baby and Janet, still separated from her husband, works towards co-parenting peacefully with him. After it turns out that Gordan left his home to Jean's grandmother, she decides to let Jean stay there if she pays rent.

Meanwhile, Jean helps to publish Gordan's memoirs, which she also discovered as part of his estate and writes the foreword. With her life back on track she goes to Ray's school where he is studying nursing and asks him to be with her.

Cast
Taylour Paige as Jean Jones
Sherri Shepherd as Maureen, Jean's mother
Erica Ash as Anne, Jean's aunt
Michelle Hurst as Daphne, Jean's grandmother
Gloria Reuben as Janet, Jean's aunt
Mamoudou Athie as Ray
Cara Ricketts as Laura, Jean's newly discovered half-aunt
Shailyn Pierre-Dixon as Mary Jones

Reception
The film received positive notices. Justin Chang, writing for Variety, called it "a fine debut". Her feature film debut, Jean of the Joneses, premiered at the SXSW Film Festival in 2016. The film received a nomination for Best First Screenplay at the Independent Spirit Awards two Canadian Screen Award nominations at the 5th Canadian Screen Awards in 2017, including a nod for Meghie in the Best Original Screenplay category.

References

External links 
 
 Jean of the Joneses at Library and Archives Canada

Canadian comedy films
English-language Canadian films
Films about families
Films about writers
Films directed by Stella Meghie
Films set in New York (state)
Films shot in Toronto
2016 films
2016 directorial debut films
2016 comedy films
2010s English-language films
2010s Canadian films
African-American films